Al-Nabi Rubin (literally "Prophet Rubin" or "Prophet Reuben"), was a Palestinian village located 28 kilometers northeast of Acre. Al-Nabi Rubin students used to attend school in the nearby village of Tarbikha.

History

Ottoman era
In 1881, the PEF's Survey of Western Palestine (SWP)  described  Al-Nabi Rubin: This is a small village round the tomb of the Neby, containing about ninety Moslems, it is situated on a prominent top, and surrounded by many  olives, a few figs and arable land; there are two cisterns and a birket near.

British rule
In  the 1945 statistics  the population Tarbikha, Suruh and  Al-Nabi Rubin together was 1000 Muslims according to an official land and population survey,  all were Muslims, and they  had a total of 18,563  dunams of land.  619  dunams were plantations and irrigable land, 3,204 used for cereals, while 112 dunams were built-up (urban) land.

Israeli period

The village was captured by Israel as a result of the Haganah's offensive, Operation Hiram during the 1948 Arab-Israeli War and was mostly destroyed with the exception of its shrine. Al-Nabi Rubin inhabitants were expelled to Lebanon in two waves, the aged and infirm were the last to depart when the IDF trucked them to the Lebanese border.

A shrine thought to be dedicated to the prophet Rubin is the only original structure that remains on former village's lands.

See also
 Depopulated Palestinian locations in Israel

References

Bibliography

External links
Welcome To al-Nabi Rubin
al-Nabi Rubin (Aka),  Zochrot
Survey of Western Palestine, Map 3:  IAA, Wikimedia commons 
Al-Nabi Rubin at Khalil Sakakini Cultural Center

Arab villages depopulated during the 1948 Arab–Israeli War
District of Acre
1948 disestablishments in Israel